All I Feel is the fourth and to date most recent studio album by American R&B singer Ray J and was released on April 7, 2008, by Knockout Entertainment, Deja34, Epic Records and Koch Records. It is the second album by Ray J to be labeled with a Parental Advisory sticker. The album features the singles "Sexy Can I" featuring labelmate Yung Berg, and "Gifts", and was his only album with Koch Records.

Conception 
An article in the Los Angeles Times asserted that Ray J wanted to distance himself from his child star image from his days acting in Moesha, the sitcom that starred his older sister Brandy. Reporter Serena Kim noticed that the lyrics were becoming more "graphic" and sexually explicit.

Commercial performance
The album debuted at number 7 on the Billboard 200 charts and number 1 on the Top R&B/Hip Hop Albums chart.

Reception 

All I Feel was panned by most music critics. Steve Jones of USA Today rated this album one-and-a-half stars out of a possible five, stating that the album "doesn’t leave much of an impression, even though Ray J tries hard to leave one". On okayplayer, Jason Reynolds considered Ray J's sexual and drug content to be vulgar and "forced". Clover Hope of Billboard magazine gave this album a moderate review for the perception that Ray J "tries too hard" to "prove himself" to be grown up, "like a wannabe rapper in singer's clothing".

Track listing

Charts

Weekly charts

Year-end charts

References 

2008 albums
Ray J albums
Albums produced by DJ Quik
Albums produced by Drumma Boy
Albums produced by Detail (record producer)
Albums produced by Rodney Jerkins
E1 Music albums
Epic Records albums
Knockout Entertainment albums